Michael the Syrian,(), died 1199 AD, also known as Michael the Great or Michael Syrus or Michael the Elder, to distinguish him from his nephew, was a patriarch of the Syriac Orthodox Church from 1166 to 1199. He is best known today as the author of the largest medieval Chronicle, which he wrote in the Syriac language. Some other works and fragments written by him have also survived.

Life
The life of Michael is recorded by Bar Hebraeus. He was born ca. 1126 in Melitene (today Malatya), the son of the Priest Eliya (Elias), of the Qindasi family. His uncle, the monk Athanasius, became bishop of Anazarbus in Cilicia in 1136.

At that period Melitene was part of the kingdom of the Turkoman Danishmend dynasty, and, when that realm was divided in two in 1142, it became the capital of one principality. In 1178 it became part of the Sultanate of Rûm. The Jacobite monastery of Mar Bar Sauma was close to the town, and had been the patriarchal seat since the 11th century.

As a child, Michael entered the service of the monastery, and became archimandrite before the age of thirty. He made various improvements to the abbey's infrastructure which include securing the abbey's water supply and strengthening of the Abbey's defenses against marauding bandits.  On 18 October 1166 he was elected Patriarch of the Jacobite church, and consecrated in the presence of twenty-eight bishops.

In 1168 he made a pilgrimage to Jerusalem, and then stayed for a year at Antioch. Both towns were at the time part of the Latin crusader states, and Michael established excellent relations with the crusader lords, especially with Amaury de Nesle, Latin patriarch of Jerusalem. Returning to the monastery of Mar Bar Sauma in the summer of 1169, he held a synod and attempted to reform the church, then tainted with simony.

The Byzantine emperor Manuel I Comnenos made approaches to him to negotiate a reunion of the churches. But Michael did not trust the Greeks. He refused to go to Constantinople when invited by the emperor, and even refused twice, in 1170 and 1172, to meet his envoy Theorianus, instead sending as his own representative bishop John of Kaishoum and then his disciple Theodore bar Wahbun. In three successive letters to the emperor, he replied with a simple statement of the miaphysite creed of the Jacobites.

Around 1174 Michael had to contend with a revolt by a party of bishops. He himself was twice arrested at the instigation of the dissident bishops, so he says; once by the servants of the prefect of Mardin and the second time by those of the emir of Mosul. Also the monks of Bar Sauma rebelled against him in 1171 and 1176.

Between 1178 and 1180 he resided again in the crusader states, at Antioch and Jerusalem. He was invited by Pope Alexander III to attend the Third Council of the Lateran, but declined. However he did participate by letter, writing a long treatise on the Albigensians, based on the information he had been given.

In 1180 his former pupil Theodore bar Wahbun had himself elected patriarch at Amida under the name of John by certain malcontent bishops, beginning a schism which lasted for thirteen years. Michael took energetic action, got hold of the anti-patriarch and locked him up at Bar Sauma and formally deposed him. Some of monks allowed Ibn Wahbon to escape, who fled to Damascus and tried in vain to appeal to Saladin. He then went to Jerusalem, and, after the fall of the city in 1187, went to Rumkale with the Armenian Catholicos Gregory IV, who allowed him to obtain official recognition from Prince Leo II of Armenian Minor. Theodore had many supporters, and the schism did not end until the death of Theodore in the summer of 1193. According to Bar Hebraeus Theodore could write and speak in Syriac, Greek, Armenian and Arabic, and composed a statement of his case against Michael in Arabic.

In 1182, Michael received the sultan Kilij Arslan II at Melitene, and held cordial talks with him.

Michael was also involved in the Egyptian controversy over the doctrine of confession, and supported Pope Mark III of Alexandria in the excommunication of Mark Ibn Kunbar.

He died at the monastery of Bar Sauma on 7 November 1199 at the age of seventy-two, having been patriarch for thirty-three years. His nephew, Michael the Younger, known as Yeshti' Sephethana [Syriac ܝܸܫܬ݂' ܣܸܦܗܸܬܗܲܢܲ] or "Big-lips", became anti-patriarch at Melitene from 1199 to 1215, in opposition to Athanasius IX and then John XIV.

Works
Michael was a profuse author. He wrote works on the liturgy, on the doctrine of the Oriental Orthodox (Jacobite) church, and on canon law. Numerous sermons have also survived, mostly unpublished. But he is best known for the World Chronicle that he composed, the longest and richest surviving chronicle in the Syriac language.

The Chronicle

This Chronicle runs from creation up to Michael's own times. It uses earlier ecclesiastical histories, some of them now lost; for instance, its coverage of the Late Antique period relies mainly upon Dionysius of Tel Mahre. It includes a version of the Testimonium Flavianum.

The work is extant in a single manuscript written in 1598 in Syriac, in Serto script. This was copied from an earlier manuscript, itself copied from Michael's autograph. The manuscript is today held in a locked box in a church in Aleppo, and recently became accessible to scholarship. French scholar Jean-Baptiste Chabot arranged for a copy to be made by hand in 1888 and published a photographic reproduction in four volumes (1899–1910), with a French translation. In 2009, the facsimile of Edessan-Aleppo codex was published by Gorgias Press in the first volume (edited by Mor Gregorios Yuhanna Ibrahim) of a series on the Chronicle of Michael the Great. A digital facsimile is also available in vHMML Reading Room.

Chronicle contains valuable historical data on Christian communities of the Near East, and their relations with other communities in the region. It also contains data on local culture, languages and various peoples. Those question have been of particular interest for researches who are studying complex questions related to historical development of religious, linguistic and ethnic identities of local Christian communities. Michael himself noted in the appendix of his Chronicle:

An abbreviated Armenian translation of the Chronicle also exists, from which Victor Langlois published a French translation in 1868. This alone preserves the preface of the work. A shorter Armenian version also exists which has not been published.

A Garshuni version is also extant in British Library ms. Orient. 4402, and an Arabic version beginning with book 5 exists in a Vatican manuscript.

As secondary witnesses: Bar Hebraeus, pseudo-Jacob, and Maribas the Chaldean all rely upon Michael's work.

Points of interest
His work has been used by NASA scientists because of his record of climatic changes, now known to be linked to volcano eruptions.  He records that in 536 AD:

And in 626 AD:

He is a contemporary source for the Latin crusader states, and records the tolerance and liberalism of the Catholic Franks towards the miaphysites:

He also praises the Templars and Hospitallers to his own people:

References

Sources

 
 
 
 
 
 
 
 
 
 
 
 
 
 
 
 
 
 
 
 
 Gregorios Y. Ibrahim (ed.), Text and Translations of the Chronicle of Michael the Great. The Edessa-Aleppo Syriac Codex of the Chronicle of Michael the Great, Vol. 1, Piscataway, NJ: Gorgias Press (2009).

External links
 
 French translation of Armenian version of the Chronicle
 English translation of preface to the Chronicle
 Robert Bedrosian, Michael the Syrian - English translation of Armenian version of the Chronicle of Michael the Syrian.
 
 NASA scientists and Michael the Syrian

Michael I Rabo
1199 deaths
1126 births
People from Malatya
Middle Eastern chronicles
Chronologists
Syrian archbishops
12th-century Syriac Orthodox Church bishops
12th-century Oriental Orthodox archbishops